Tsvetkovo is a rural locality (a village) in Golovinskoye Rural Settlement, Sudogodsky District, Vladimir Oblast, Russia. The population was 8 as of 2010.

Geography 
Tsvetkovo is located 28 km west of Sudogda (the district's administrative centre) by road. Telesnikovo is the nearest rural locality.

References 

Rural localities in Sudogodsky District